Gymnopleurus miliaris is a species of dung beetle found in India, Sri Lanka, Afghanistan, and Bhutan.

Description
This broad, less convex species has an average length of about 7.5 to 11.5 mm. Body bluish black to dark green or coppery with grey setae on dorsum. Head densely granulate. Clypeus consists with four blunt lobes at its front edge. Pronotum densely granulate. Elytra densely granulate. Pygidium granular and setose at the base.

References 

Scarabaeinae
Insects of Sri Lanka
Insects of India
Insects described in 1775